The Multiple Sclerosis Journal (formerly Multiple Sclerosis) is a monthly peer-reviewed medical journal covering the clinical neurology of multiple sclerosis. The editor-in-chief is Alan J Thompson (University College London). It was established in 1995 and is published by SAGE Publications.

Abstracting and indexing 
The journal is abstracted and indexed in:

According to the Journal Citation Reports, its 2021 impact factor is 5.855, ranking it 40 out of 212 journals in the category "Clinical Neurology".

History 

The journal was first established in 1995 with Ingrid Allen (Queen's University Belfast) as founding editor. Three issues appeared in 1995, five in 1996, and from 1997 six issues appeared each year until 2006. In 2007 there were nine issues and in 2009, the current monthly publication was established. Donald Silverberg took over the editorship of the journal. He retired in 2006 and was succeeded by Alan J Thompson.

References

External links 
 

SAGE Publishing academic journals
English-language journals
Neurology journals
Publications established in 1995
Monthly journals